Morton Glacier is a glacier,  long, descending eastward from the Holland Range, Antarctica, between Vaughan Promontory and Lewis Ridge to the Ross Ice Shelf. It was named by the Advisory Committee on Antarctic Names for Lieutenant Commander John A. Morton, officer in charge of U.S. Navy Squadron VX-6 Detachment ALFA, which wintered at McMurdo Station in 1964.

References

Glaciers of Shackleton Coast